The HP-18C was a Hewlett-Packard business calculator which was quickly followed by the very similar but greatly improved HP-19B.  The HP-18C was HP's first RPL-based calculator internally, even though this was not visible on user-level in this non user-programmable model. The user did have a solver (another HP first) available, but only had about 1.5 KB of continuous memory available to store equations.

The calculator had many functions buried in a menu structure. The clamshell design was fairly robust, but the battery door is the shortcoming of this whole line; 18C, 19B, and 28C/S.

The HP-18C was introduced in June 1986.

See also
 HP calculators
 List of Hewlett-Packard products: Pocket calculators

References

External links
HP-18C on MyCalcDB (database about 1970s and 1980s pocket calculators)
HP-18C at HP's Virtual Museum

18C